Neunburg vorm Wald is a municipality in the district of Schwandorf, in Bavaria, Germany. It is situated 21 km east of Schwandorf on the river Schwarzach, a tributary of the Naab.

Mayor
The mayor is Martin Birner (CSU). He was elected in 2014 with 77,98 % of the votes, and re-elected in 2020.

Population development
Population development (with incorporations):

Sons and daughters of the town
 Johann Agricola (1590-1668), physician, alchemist and saline expert
 Elisabeth Röckel (1793-1883), opera singer, wife of Johann Nepomuk Hummel
 Gregor von Scherr (1804-1877), Archbishop of Munich and Freising, name giver for the local school

References

Schwandorf (district)